Teymurlu Rural District is in Gugan District of Azarshahr County, East Azerbaijan province, Iran. At the census of 2006, its population was 7,723 in 2,075 households; there were 7,998 inhabitants in 2,502 households at the following census of 2011; and in the most recent census of 2016, the population of the rural district was 2,673 in 791 households. The largest of its three villages was Qaraghil, with 1,723 people.

References 

Azarshahr County

Rural Districts of East Azerbaijan Province

Populated places in East Azerbaijan Province

Populated places in Azarshahr County